Noor Farah Hersi is a Somali politician. He belongs to the Habar-Yonis subclan of the Isaaq. He is the Minister of Constitutional Affairs of Somalia, having been appointed to the position on 27 January 2015 by Prime Minister Omar Abdirashid Ali Sharmarke.

References

Living people
Government ministers of Somalia
Year of birth missing (living people)